Rear admiral Sir Harry Burrard Neale, 2nd Baronet  (born Burrard; 16 September 1765 – 7 February 1840) was a British officer of the Royal Navy, and Member of Parliament for Lymington.

He was the son of William Burrard, the governor of Yarmouth Castle on the Isle of Wight, and nephew of Sir Harry Burrard, 1st Baronet, of Walhampton, whom he succeeded in 1791. In 1795, he adopted the additional name of Neale on his marriage to Grace, daughter of Robert Neale of Shaw House, Wiltshire.

Naval career
Educated at Christchurch Grammar School, Burrard joined the Royal Navy in 1778. He was present at the Siege of Charleston in 1780 during the American Revolutionary War.

Burrard distinguished himself during the mutiny at the Nore in 1797. He was one of the Lords of the Admiralty between 1804 and 1807, and was promoted to rear-admiral on 31 July 1810. He was engaged at the action of 13 March 1806 during the Napoleonic Wars aboard HMS London. He was invested as a Knight Commander of the Order of the Bath on 2 January 1815, and advanced to a Knight Grand Cross of that order on 14 September 1822. He became Commander-in-Chief, Mediterranean Fleet in 1823, which led to his appointment as a Knight Grand Cross of the Order of St Michael and St George the following year.

In the summer of 1809 he was called as a witness at the court-martial of James, Lord Gambier which assessed whether Admiral Lord Gambier had failed to support Captain Lord Cochrane at the Battle of the Basque Roads in April 1809. Gambier was controversially cleared of all charges.

Political career
Neale was Member of Parliament for Lymington from 1790 to 1802, 1806 to 1807, 1812 to 1823 and 1832 to 1835. He was a Groom of the Bedchamber to King George III from 1801 to 1812, continuing afterwards at Windsor from 1812 to 1820 during the Regency.

Personal life
Burrard Neale died without issue at age 74 in 1840, and was buried at Lymington parish church. He was succeeded by his brother George.

Namesakes

Burrard Inlet was named in his honour by Captain George Vancouver in June 1792, during his expedition of exploration in the Pacific Northwest. During the later development of the city of Vancouver, a major north–south thoroughfare, Burrard Street, was named for the inlet, which subsequently gave its name to Burrard Bridge, one of the three major bridges that connect downtown Vancouver to its suburbs to the south. The inlet and street have inspired many other building, business and institution names in the Vancouver area, so although Harry Burrard never visited British Columbia his name is commonly found in that area.

References

George Edward Cokayne, editor, The Complete Baronetage, 5 volumes (no date (c. 1900); reprint, Gloucester, U.K.: Alan Sutton Publishing, 1983), volume V, page 148.

External links
 
 
 Burrard-Neale 250 Project, 2015

|-

|-

1765 births
1840 deaths
People from Yarmouth, Isle of Wight
Burrard Neale, Sir Harry, 2nd Baronet
British MPs 1790–1796
British MPs 1796–1800
Lords of the Admiralty
Members of the Parliament of Great Britain for Lymington
Members of the Parliament of the United Kingdom for Lymington
Royal Navy admirals
UK MPs 1801–1802
UK MPs 1806–1807
UK MPs 1812–1818
UK MPs 1818–1820
UK MPs 1820–1826
UK MPs 1832–1835
Knights Grand Cross of the Order of the Bath
Knights Grand Cross of the Order of St Michael and St George
Royal Navy personnel of the American Revolutionary War
Royal Navy personnel of the Napoleonic Wars